Voodoo Glow Skulls are an American ska punk band formed in 1988 in Riverside, California, by brothers Frank, Eddie, and Jorge Casillas and their longtime friend Jerry O'Neill. Voodoo Glow Skulls first played at backyard parties and later at Spanky's Café in their hometown of Riverside, where they played shows with the Angry Samoans, The Mighty Mighty Bosstones, Firehose, Murphy's Law, and The Dickies.

History 
Their first recording was in 1989a four-song demo on a four-track machine which they duplicated onto about sixty cassettes on a home stereo then sold at shows.

In 1990, Voodoo Glow Skulls released their first 7" EP The Old of Tomorrow, a parody title inspired by the straight edge band named Youth of Today, with the help of local band Public Humiliation, and also booked their own DIY US tour.

In 1991, the band added a horn section to their live shows and recordings, due mostly to the influence of two of their favorite bands at the time, Fishbone and Red Hot Chili Peppers. The band's second independent release came out in 1992 with the Rasta Mis Huevos 7" EP for Signal Sound Systems Records. This label also released a glow-in-the-dark 12" EP titled We're Coloring Fun and the first release of The Potty Training Years on CD.

Voodoo Glow Skulls recorded their debut album Who Is, This Is? for Dr. Strange Records in 1993, gaining the attention of Brett Gurewitz, owner of Epitaph Records.The band then signed to Epitaph Records and released a further four albums. The band began to tour worldwide with their first European tour in 1996 followed by Japan, Australia, Mexico, and South America.

The band has been featured on several of Epitaph's Punk-O-Rama releases and has had music featured in video games, television and movies.

The song "Shoot the Moon" from the band's Firme album was used in the Pauly Shore movie Bio-Dome and the band's version of "Used to Love Her" (originally written and recorded by Guns N' Roses) is featured in the Mr. & Mrs. Smith soundtrack.

In 2002, Voodoo Glow Skulls signed to Victory Records. The band released three albums on the Victory label and continued to tour.

On January 18, 2012, the band released its self-produced ninth album, Break the Spell, through Smelvis Records.

The band contributed a song to the 2015 Rancid tribute compilation Hooligans United.

The band appeared as musical guests during the second season of Lucha Underground in 2016.

On June 3, 2017, Frank Casillas announced he was quitting Voodoo Glow Skulls, live on stage during a show at Alex's Bar in Long Beach, CA. The band has continued playing with Efrem Schulz from Death by Stereo on vocals.

Members

Current 
Eddie Casillas – guitar
Jorge Casillas – bass guitar
Steve Reese – drums
Eric Fazzini – sax
Jose Pazsoldan – trombone
Efrem Schulz – vocals

Former 
Frank Casillas – vocals
Jerry O'Neill – drums
Brodie Johnson – trombone
Joey Hernandez – saxophone
Chris Dalley – drums
Vince Sollecito – drums
AJ Condosta – drums
Ruben Durazo – trombone
Dan Albert – trombone
Joe McNally – trumpet
Mason Ball – trumpet
Gabriel Dunn – trumpet
Mark Bush – trumpet
Don Giese – trumpet
Jonathan Cestero- saxophone

Discography

Albums 
Who Is, This Is? – 1993 Dr. Strange Records
Firme – 1995 Epitaph Records
Firme (en Español) – 1996 Epitaph Records
Baile de Los Locos – 1997 Epitaph Records
The Band Geek Mafia – 1998 Epitaph Records
Symbolic – 2000 Epitaph Records
Steady as She Goes – 2002 Victory Records
Adicción, Tradición, Revolución – 2004 Victory Records
Southern California Street Music – 2007 Victory Records
Break the Spell – 2012 Smelvis Records
Livin' the Apocalypse – 2021 Dr. Strange Records

EPs 
The Old of Tomorrow 7" EP – 1990 Goon Records & Drapes
Rasta Mis Huevos 7" EP – 1992 Signal Sound System Records
We're Coloring Fun 12" EP – 1993 Signal Sound Systems Records
Dogpile! 7" EP – 1993 Dr. Strange Records
Land of Misfit Toys 7" EP – 1995 Dr. Strange Records

Voodoo Glow Skulls compilations 
The Potty Training Years – 1993 Signal Sound Systems Records
Exitos Al Cabron – 1999 Grita Records
The Potty Training Years 1988–1992 – 2000 El Pocho Loco Records

Compilations 
The Melting Pot – 1991 Sinbad Records
Very Small World – 1992 Very Small World Records
Welcome to Califucknia – 1992 Signal Sound Systems Records
Misfits of Ska – 1995 Asian Man Records
Nothing to Believe In – 1995 Know Records
Punk Sucks – 1995 Liberation Records
Punk-O-Rama Vol. 2 – 1996 Epitaph Records
Give 'Em the Boot – 1997 Hellcat Records
Cinema Beer Nuts – 1997 Hopeless Records
Pure Eskañol: Latin Ska Underground – 1997 Aztlan Records
We Are Not Devo – 1997 Centipede Records
Godmoney: Motion Picture Soundtrack – 1997 V2 Records
Punk-O-Rama Vol. 3 – 1998 Epitaph Records
Skaliente – 1998 Grita! Records
Ska: The Third Wave Vol. 4 – Punk It Up!! 1998 Beloved Records
Punk-O-Rama Vol. 4 – 1999 Epitaph Records
Of Things to Come – 1999 Better Youth Organization (BYO)
Rebirth of the Loud – 2000 Priority Records
Punk-O-Rama Vol. 5 – 2000 Epitaph Records
Shut the Punk Up! Vol. 2 – 2001 New School Records!
Punk-O-Rama Vol. 6 – 2001 Epitaph Records
Know Your Skalphabet 2 – 2002 Good Clean Fun Records
Dive into Disney – 2002 Walt Disney Records
Victory Style 5 – 2002 Victory Records
Still Standing – North American Ska Uprising – 2003 Jump Up Records
Mr. & Mrs. Smith: Motion Picture Soundtrack – 2005 Lakeshore Records
Forever Free A Sublime Tribute Album – 2006 Baseline Music Co.
Ska is Dead – 2007 Asian Man Records
Punk Rock Concoction Vol. 2 – 2008 Dimwit Records
Kingrock Entertainment Vol. 1 – 2008
Bienvenidos a Cafeina Riot Radio – 2009
2009 Vans Warped Tour Compilation – 2009 SideOneDummy Records

References

External links

Hardcore punk groups from California
American ska musical groups
Third-wave ska groups
Asian Man Records artists
Epitaph Records artists
Victory Records artists
Musical groups established in 1988
Musical groups from Riverside County, California
1988 establishments in California